is a private college headquartered in Shinagawa, Tokyo, Japan.

History 
The founder SUGINO Yoshiko (1892-1978) established a vocational school "Dressmaker School" in 1926. Then she established "Sugino Women's College" in 1964. The college was reorganized into a coeducational college "Sugino Fashion College" in 2002.

Organization

Undergraduate programs 
 Department of Fashion
 Faculty of Fashion
 Faculty of Fashion Presentation

Graduate programs 
 Advanced Course for Fashion Design (one-year program)
 Master Course for Plastic Arts

Campuses

Meguro Campus 
 4-6-19 Kami-Ōsaki, Shinagawa, Tokyo, 141-8652 Japan

Hino Campus 
 1006-44 Mogusa, Hino, Tokyo, 191-0033 Japan

References

External links

 Official website 

Educational institutions established in 1926
Private universities and colleges in Japan
Universities and colleges in Tokyo
1926 establishments in Japan
Hino, Tokyo
Shinagawa